Ajmal Faizzada (born 20 May 1987) is an Afghan judoka. At London 2012 he competed in the Men's 66 kg, but was defeated in the first round by Hungary's Miklos Ungvari.

References

External links
 

Afghan male judoka
1987 births
Living people
Olympic judoka of Afghanistan
Judoka at the 2012 Summer Olympics